Gerberga of Gleiberg (c. 970 – aft. 1036) was a daughter of Herbert of Wetterau and Irmtrud of Avalgau (957 – 1020).

She married Henry of Schweinfurt and had the following children:
Otto III, Duke of Swabia
Eilika of Schweinfurt (c. 1005 – 10 Dec c. 1059), married Bernard II, Duke of Saxony
Judith of Schweinfurt
possibly Burchard (d. 18 Oct 1059), bishop in 1036 of Halberstadt, chancellor of Conrad II, Holy Roman Emperor
possibly Henry, count on the Pegnitz, on the Upper Naab and on the Altmühl. In 1040, he took part in an expedition to Bohemia and had many conflicts with the bishop of Eichstätt. Married a daughter of Kuno of Altdorf (c. 980 – aft. 1020).

Ancestry

970s births
11th-century deaths
Year of birth uncertain

Year of death unknown
11th-century German women